Rodolpho Riskalla (born 29 December 1984) is a Brazilian equestrian, who won silver in the individual championship test grade IV at the 2020 Summer Paralympics.

References

1984 births
Living people
Brazilian male equestrians
Brazilian dressage riders
Paralympic equestrians of Brazil
Paralympic silver medalists for Brazil
Paralympic medalists in equestrian
Medalists at the 2020 Summer Paralympics
Equestrians at the 2016 Summer Paralympics
Equestrians at the 2020 Summer Paralympics
20th-century Brazilian people
21st-century Brazilian people